Deltavjatia was a pareiasauromorph procolophonoid from the Tatarian stage of the Permian time period. Deltavjatia was an herbivore and lived in what is now Russia. The first specimen of Deltavjatia was a specimen of a skull and lower mandible (PIN 2212/1), found in the Urpalov Formation in Kotelnich, Vyatka River. Since then, numerous mostly complete skeletons have been found, many of them being so well preserved due to the silty, anaerobic environment of the Kotelnich deposits that fossilised white blood cells are able to be distinguished in them. Analyses of the bone histology of Deltavjatia show that they grew very rapidly during the early stages of their ontogeny but that their growth rate drastically slowed down once they reached approximately half of their full body size.
 
Deltavjatia was placed as a subtaxon of Pareiasauridae by M.S.Y. Lee in 1997.

See also

Pareiasaur
Procolophonia
Kotelnich
Vyatka (river)
Russia

References

External links
Pareiasauridae

Pareiasaurs
Permian reptiles
Extinct animals of Russia
Fossil taxa described in 1937
Prehistoric reptile genera